Protowenella is a genus of helcionellid from the Middle Cambrian of Australia.  It has a strongly spiralled, smooth shell with  concentric ridges that have low relief. Other than its tighter coiling, it is very similar to Tichkaella.

References

Prehistoric mollusc genera
Cambrian molluscs
Prehistoric invertebrates of Oceania
Molluscs of Australia